Niels Henry Secher (born 24 June 1946) is a Danish medical research scientist and retired rower. Together with Jørgen Engelbrecht, he won a world title at the 1970 World Rowing Championships and finished fourth at the 1972 Summer Olympics in the double sculls event. In the single sculls, he placed eights at the 1968 Summer Olympics.

After retiring from competitions Secher focused on medical research, becoming professor and head of the Cardiovascular Research Laboratory at Rigshospitalet, part of Copenhagen University Hospital. His research is focused on brain blood flow and oxygenation.

References

External links
 

1946 births
Living people
Danish male rowers
Olympic rowers of Denmark
Rowers at the 1968 Summer Olympics
Rowers at the 1972 Summer Olympics
World Rowing Championships medalists for Denmark
People from Frederiksberg